Below is a list of the major power stations in Shanghai, China.

Thermal power stations
Coal-based

Natural Gas Based

Wind power

 Donghai Bridge Wind Power Farm is the first marine wind power farm in China.

Solar power

References 

Power stations
Shanghai
Power stations